Bernina can refer to:

Geography
Bernina Range, a mountain range in the Swiss and Italian Alps
Piz Bernina, the highest peak of the Bernina Range
Bernina Pass, a pass in the Bernina Range
Bernina District, former administrative district in the canton of Graubünden, Switzerland

Rail transport
Bernina railway, a single-track railway connecting Switzerland and Italy via the Bernina Pass
Bernina Express, a train running on the Bernina railway
Bernina Diavolezza (Rhaetian Railway station), a station on the Bernina railway
Bernina Lagalb (Rhaetian Railway station), a station on the Bernina railway
Bernina Suot (Rhaetian Railway station), a station on the Bernina railway

Organizations
Bernina International, a manufacturer of sewing and embroidery systems